Hisamitsu may refer to:

Hisamitsu Pharmaceutical, a Japanese pharmaceutical company
Hisamitsu Springs, a Japanese women's volleyball team based in Kobe city, Hyogo

People with the given name
, Japanese futsal player
, Japanese samurai and daimyō

Japanese masculine given names